Berkrerk Chartvanchai (October 25, 1944 – March 7, 2022) was a boxing champion who won the WBA World Flyweight Title on April 5, 1970 against Bernabe Villacampo in a fifteen round split decision at Bangkok, Thailand. Chartvanchai became the third Thai in history to hold a version of the World Flyweight Title (The first one is Pone Kingpetch, the second is a Chartchai Chionoi).

Early life and career
Chartvanchai was born in Thai Chinese family on October 25, 1944 in Phra Nakhon District near Memorial Bridge, Bangkok, Thailand. His real name was Tinapong Sae-Han (ติณพงษ์ แซ่ห่าน) or  Tinapong Hantanasirisakul (ติณพงษ์ หาญตนศิริสกุล). Before he was a professional boxer, he used to be a famous Muay Thai fighter under the ring name "Berkrerk Lookyodfah" (เบิกฤกษ์ ลูกยอดฟ้า). He had won the championships of the Rajadamnern Stadium and Lumpinee Boxing Stadium.

He began competitive professional boxing in early 1966, and in his first twenty-seven bouts through January 1970, he won twenty-four with the remaining three as draws.  Nearly all of his early bouts took place in his native Bangkok.  By June 1967, he was fighting better known opponents, winning his first bout with Bernabe Villacampo on May 6, 1969, in a ten round points decision.

Taking the WBA World Flyweight Title
Chartvanchai took the WBA World Flyweight Title on April 5, 1970 against Bernabe Villacampo in a fifteen round split decision at Charusathian Stadium, Bangkok, Thailand.  In a close bout, the Associated Press had the scoring 73-70 for Chartvanchai. Chartvanchai used primarily body punches and solid defense to take the title. He made Villicampo miss repeatedly and scored frequently with blows to the torso. In the eighth he opened a cut above Villacampo's eye that bothered his opponent throughout the remainder of the bout. One source noted "Villicampo...was the more aggressive but could not land telling blows." Many of Chartvanchai's best scoring punches were quick strikes to the torso after breaking out of clinches.

On July 25, 1970, in a non-title fight he lost to Filipino boxer Erbito Salavario in a non-title ten round fight in Manila. Salavario was Flyweight Champion of the Orient. Chartvantchai at 115, outweighed his opponent by two pounds.

Losing the WBA World Flyweight Title
On October 22, 1970, he lost the WBA World Flyweight Title in a thirteenth round knockout against Masao Oba in a title bout at Nichidi Auditorium in Tokyo, Japan. According to one source, the bout was postponed from its initial date when Chartvanchai took ill with a high fever. Chartvanchai was down three times in the third round before finally being called out for the full count at their bout at Nihon University. Enrique Jimenez refereed.  Chartvanchai was finished off with a volley of punches to the head at 2:16 into the thirteenth round. He had trouble making the weight limit, even after doing light exercise and taking a steam bath, which may have weakened him for the bout.  Oba gained a considerable lead in points throughout the match.

Retirement
After retiring he changed his real name to Berkrerk Chartvanchai. Chartvanchai studied at the Postal School, and worked as a postal employee of the Communications Authority of Thailand  (CAT) until retirement in 2004. He later lived with his family at Bang Bua Thong District, Nonthaburi Province. Chartvanchai died on March 7, 2022, at the age of 77.

References

External links

Achievements

1944 births
2022 deaths
World Boxing Association champions
World flyweight boxing champions
Flyweight boxers
World boxing champions
Berkrerk Chartvanchai
Berkrerk Chartvanchai
Berkrerk Chartvanchai
Berkrerk Chartvanchai
Berkrerk Chartvanchai